was an  destroyer of the Imperial Japanese Navy. Her name means "November".

Design and description
The Akizuki-class ships were originally designed as anti-aircraft escorts for carrier battle groups, but were modified with torpedo tubes and depth charges to meet the need for a more general-purpose destroyer. Her crew numbered 300 officers and enlisted men.

The ships had two Kampon geared steam turbines, each driving one propeller shaft, using steam provided by three Kampon water-tube boilers.

The main armament of the Akizuki class consisted of eight Type 98  dual purpose guns in four twin-gun turrets, two superfiring pairs fore and aft of the superstructure. They carried four Type 96  anti-aircraft guns in two twin-gun mounts. The ships were also armed with four  torpedo tubes in a single quadruple traversing mount; one reload was carried for each tube. Their anti-submarine weapons comprised six depth charge throwers for which 72 depth charges were carried.

Construction and career

Notes

References

External links
 CombinedFleet.com: Akizuki-class destroyers
 CombinedFleet.com: Shimotsuki history

Akizuki-class destroyers (1942)
World War II destroyers of Japan
Ships sunk by American submarines
Shipwrecks in the Natuna Sea
World War II shipwrecks in the South China Sea
1943 ships
Maritime incidents in November 1944

ru:Симоцуки